Maarat Saidnaya, or Maaret Saidnaya is a mountainous village in Al-Tall District of Damascus's Countryside Rif Dimashq Governorate, Syria. According to the Syria Central Bureau of Statistics (CBS), Maarat Saidnaya had a population of 3,084 in the 2004 census. In 1838, the majority of its inhabitants were Melkite Catholic Christians.

Located on the mountain side at the town's outskirts, the Shrine of Mar Elias Al-Hai (Shrine of St. Elijah the Living; Arabic: مقام مار الياس الحي ; pronounced: "Deir or Makam Mar Elias Al-Hai"), is one of its most famous attractions . Many people come every year to visit this Melkite Greek Catholic Church especially to celebrate St. Elijah day of 20 June.
 
Notably also, the Mor Ephrem Monastery, consecrated in 1996, is the summer residence of the Patriarch of the Syriac Orthodox Church, along with the church seminary and the recently founded Antioch Syrian University.

References

Bibliography

Populated places in Al-Tall District
Christian communities in Syria